The Jeh-Tariang people, also written as Gie Trieng people are an ethnic group in Vietnam. Most Jeh-Tariang live in the province of Kon Tum, in Vietnam's Central Highlands region, and in 2019 the population was 63,322. They speak Jeh language and Tariang language - a part of Mon–Khmer language.

They practice the custom of interring bodies of the dead by hanging the coffin on a tree.

Notable Jeh-Tariang 
 A Huỳnh, football player, playing for the Hoàng Anh Gia Lai Club.

References 

Ethnic groups in Vietnam